Dyella kyungheensis is a Gram-negative, aerobic and motile bacterium from the genus of Dyella with a polar flagellum which has been isolated from soil of a field with cornus fruits from Hoengseong in Korea.

References

Xanthomonadales
Bacteria described in 2013